The Canton of Troyes-7 is a former canton of the arrondissement of Troyes, in the Aube department, in northern France. It had 18,133 inhabitants (2012). It was disbanded following the French canton reorganisation which came into effect in March 2015. It consisted of 4 communes:
Bréviandes
Rosières-près-Troyes
Saint-Julien-les-Villas
Troyes (partly)

References 

Troyes-7
Troyes
2015 disestablishments in France
States and territories disestablished in 2015